L42 may refer to:
 HMS Brocklesby (L42), an ex-coaster taken up from trade that served in World War I for the British Royal Navy
 Lee–Enfield L42, a sniper rifle
 Mitochondrial ribosomal protein L42, a human protein
 Sako Model L42, a rifle
 Spanish landing ship Pizarro (L42)
 an engine in GM's Ecotec engine family
 a version of the Chaika L-4 amphibian aircraft
 l42_0 is also a famous roblox hockey player in PGHO and PGHL